Amethyst is an album by American jazz drummer Billy Hart recorded in 1993 and released on the Arabesque label.

Reception

AllMusic awarded the album 3 stars with its review by David R. Adler stating, "there's plenty of beautiful music on the album, plenty of representative brilliance from all these fine players, and even a substantial amount of originality and vision".

Track listing
All compositions by Billy Hart except as indicated
 "Amethyst" - 12:14
 "King of Harts" (John Stubblefield) - 7:35
 "El Junque" (Santi Debriano) - 7:32
 "Melanos" (David Fiuzynski) - 10:09
 "Irah" - 6:52
 "Asylum" (Mark Feldman) - 12:05
 "Dirty Dogs" (David Kikoski) - 10:25

Personnel
Billy Hart - drums
John Stubblefield - tenor saxophone, soprano saxophone 
David Fiuzynski - guitar  
David Kikoski - piano
Marc Copland - keyboards (tracks 5 & 6) 
Mark Feldman - violin
Santi Debriano - bass

References

Arabesque Records albums
Billy Hart albums
1993 albums